Nikita Alekseyevich Zhdankin (born 13 October 1989) is a Russian former professional football player.

Club career
He played two seasons in the Russian Football National League for FC Ural Sverdlovsk Oblast and FC Gazovik Orenburg.

External links
 
 

1989 births
Sportspeople from Chelyabinsk
Living people
Russian footballers
Association football forwards
Association football midfielders
FC Ural Yekaterinburg players
FC Orenburg players
FC Solyaris Moscow players
FC Krasnodar players
FC Volga Ulyanovsk players